Zall-Herr is a village and administrative unit in the municipality of Tirana, central Albania. As of the 2011 census, the administrative unit of Zall-Herr had an estimated population of 9,389 of whom 4,830 were men and 4,559 women.

References 

Villages in Tirana County
Administrative units of Tirana
Former municipalities in Tirana County